Martin William Byrnes (born April 30, 1956) is a retired American professional basketball player.

Born in, Syracuse, New York, a 6'7" forward from Syracuse University, Byrnes played four seasons (1978–1981; 1982–1983) in the National Basketball Association  (NBA) as a member of the Phoenix Suns, New Orleans Jazz, Los Angeles Lakers, Dallas Mavericks, and Indiana Pacers.  He averaged 5.7 points per game in his NBA career and won an NBA Championship with the Lakers in 1980.

External links

1956 births
Living people
American expatriate basketball people in Italy
American men's basketball players
Basketball players from Syracuse, New York
Charleston Gunners players
Dallas Mavericks expansion draft picks
Dallas Mavericks players
Indiana Pacers players
Los Angeles Lakers players
New Orleans Jazz players
Phoenix Suns draft picks
Phoenix Suns players
Rochester Zeniths players
Scaligera Basket Verona players
Small forwards
Syracuse Orange men's basketball players
Virtus Bologna players